The LG Cup is an international exhibition association football tournament organised by LG Electronics, a South Korean company. LG describe the competition as a "social marketing experiment". 

The inaugural competition took place in 1997 in Tunis, Tunisia.

Editions

Most successful national teams

References

General

Specific

External links

International association football competitions in Africa
International association football competitions in Asia
LG Sports
International men's association football invitational tournaments